T'wina T. Nobles (née Fields, formerly T'wina Franklin, born 1981) is an American politician and educator serving as a member of the Washington State Senate from the 28th district. Elected in 2020, she assumed office on January 11, 2021.

Early life and education 
Nobles was born in a military family in Frankfurt, Germany. Nobles' mother was a drug user, and the family lived in Monterey, California before settling in the Columbus, Georgia area. Nobles was eventually placed in the foster care system in Phenix City, Alabama and became pregnant when she was 19. She earned a Bachelor of Arts degree in politics and Master of Education in teaching from the University of Puget Sound.

Career 
After earning her master's degree, Nobles worked as a teacher at Stadium High School and Lincoln High School in Tacoma, Washington. She served as a member of the University Place, Washington School Board and was the president of the Tacoma Urban League.

In March 2020, Nobles announced her candidacy for the 28th district in the Washington State Senate against incumbent Republican Steve O'Ban. Nobles won the Democratic primary and narrowly defeated O'Ban in the November general election. When she assumed office on January 11, 2021, she became the first black legislator elected to the Senate since 2010.

Nobles is the vice chair of both Senate Committee on Higher Education and Workforce Development and the Senate K-12 Education Committee. She is also a member of the Transportation Committee.

Personal life 
Nobles and her husband have four children. Nobles' husband is a non-profit executive director and real estate broker in Tacoma.

References 

Living people
Democratic Party Washington (state) state senators
University of Puget Sound alumni
People from Tacoma, Washington
Women state legislators in Washington (state)
21st-century American women politicians
21st-century American politicians
African-American women in politics
African-American state legislators in Washington (state)
1981 births
21st-century African-American women
21st-century African-American politicians
20th-century African-American people
20th-century African-American women